The 2017–18 Wearside Football League season is the 126th in the history of Wearside Football League, a football competition in England.

Wearside Football League consists of 18 clubs.

The following 3 clubs left the Wearside League before the season -
 Jarrow – promoted to Northern League Division Two
 Seaham Red Star Reserves - folded
 Ashbrooke Belford House - folded

The following club joined the Wearside League before the season -
 Hebburn Town Reserves

League table

References

11
Wearside Football League seasons